Malcolm Noble "Mac" MacLeod (born February 8, 1928) was a Canadian politician. Born in Moncton, New Brunswick, he served as a longtime member of the Legislative Assembly of New Brunswick representing the electoral district of Albert from 1970 to his defeat in 1987 when his Progressive Conservatives lost every seat in the legislature.

He was the second longest serving Minister of Agriculture in New Brunswick, serving as Minister of Agriculture and Rural Development from 1974 to 1985.  He served as Minister of Natural Resources and Energy from 1985 until the defeat of his government in 1987.  Following the election he served as interim leader of the PC Party until the election of Barbara Baird in 1989.

References

Progressive Conservative Party of New Brunswick MLAs
Members of the Executive Council of New Brunswick
People from Moncton
Living people
1928 births
Leaders of the Progressive Conservative Party of New Brunswick